Ian Whyte may refer to:

 Ian Whyte (actor) (born 1971), Welsh actor, stuntman, and former basketball player
 Ian Whyte (conductor) (1901–1960), Scottish conductor
Ian D. Whyte (1948–2019), British geographer

See also
Ian White (disambiguation)